James M. Mannas Jr. (born September 15, 1941) is an American photographer, film director, cinematographer and writer. He is recognized as one of the founding fifteen members of the Kamoinge Workshop (1963), which evolved from the union of two separate groups of African American photographers who were based in New York City. His work depicts African American New York City street life, avant-garde jazz musicians; dancers; portraits; landscapes; and post-colonial Guyana.

Early life and education
Mannas was born in Newark, New Jersey. He came from a family of thirteen children, who settled in Harlem. Mannas received a certificate from New York University for studies in film and television.

Career

Photography: Kamoinge Workshop
In the beginning of the 1960s, Mannas and other black photographers, including Louis Draper, Albert Fennar, Ray Francis, Herman Howard, Earl James, Calvin Mercer, Herbert Randall, Larry Stewart, Shawn Walker and Calvin Wilson, founded the Kamoinge Workshop, through combining two pre-existing groups of black photographers. Draper wrote, “We saw ourselves as a group who were trying to nurture each other.”

They were mentored by the established African American photographer, Roy DeCarava, who became the collective's first director in 1963. It was at DeCarva's Sixth Avenue and West 38th Street loft that most of the group's meetings were held in the latter part of 1963. Mannas presided over the Kamoinge Workshop as president from 1976 to 1977. He was acting director in 1979.

Mannas appears in “The Black Photographers Annual” Volume I and Volume 2.

Film
Following the assassination of Martin Luther King Jr. on April 4, 1968, Mannas captured public reaction in the Brooklyn neighborhood, Bedford Stuyvesant. The result was the film, King Is Dead, (1968). In 1969, he shot Kick, which documents "a woman's efforts to help her husband overcome addiction."

References

1941 births
Living people
American photographers
American film directors
People from Newark, New Jersey
New York University alumni